John Keiller Greig (12 June 1881 – 1971) was a British figure skater. He was a three-time British national champion and was placed at fourth at the 1908 Olympics.

Competitive highlights

References 

1881 births
1971 deaths
British male single skaters
Scottish male single skaters
Sportspeople from Dundee
Figure skaters at the 1908 Summer Olympics
Olympic figure skaters of Great Britain